Kahriz-e Baba Hoseyn (also Romanized as Kahrīz-e Bābā Ḩoseyn; also known as Kahrīz, Kahrīz-e Bābā Ḩoseynī, Kārīz, and Kārīz-e Bābā Ḩoseynī) is a village in Mehraban-e Sofla Rural District, Gol Tappeh District, Kabudarahang County, Hamadan Province, Iran. At the 2006 census, its population was 381, in 84 families.

References 

Populated places in Kabudarahang County